Lisa Townsend (born January 1980) has been the Surrey Police and Crime Commissioner (PCC) since May 2021.

Background and career 
She graduated from Sheffield Hallam University with a degree in law and completed a masters in law at University College London. She previously stood for the Conservative Party in Norwich South at the 2015 United Kingdom general election.

Townsend replaced David Munro after she was elected with a total of 155,116 votes, ahead of the second candidate by 42,951 votes.

Townsend worked for the Institute of Directors, until her election as PCC. She had previously worked for several MPs at Westminster.

References

1980 births
Living people
Alumni of Sheffield Hallam University
Alumni of University College London
Police and crime commissioners in England
Conservative Party police and crime commissioners
Conservative Party (UK) parliamentary candidates
21st-century British women politicians